The Young European Movement UK (YEM UK) is a non-partisan political group that advocates for increased youth participation in political affairs and for a close relationship between the United Kingdom and the European Union. It was formed in 1972 as a non-partisan platform for under 35s to express their opinions on Europe. It is the UK section of the Young European Federalists and the youth wing of the European Movement UK.

Activities 

YEM UK has organised and been present at various events such as marches and protests. In March 2017, an anti-Brexit protest was held in Edinburgh, at which the chairman of the local branch said: "We want to raise the issue in British and Scottish people's lives that you have lies in the referendum campaign that people were not held accountable for and, whether you voted Remain or Leave, that is a real issue."

References

Further reading

External links

See also
Brexit
Young European Federalists
Union of European Federalists
European Movement UK
Federalisation of the European Union

Youth organisations based in the United Kingdom
Pro-Europeanism in the United Kingdom
1972 establishments in the United Kingdom
Youth organizations established in 1972
European Union–related advocacy groups in the United Kingdom